Dar as-Sa'd (House of Happiness), also written Dar Al-Sada , is a royal palace located in Sana'a, Yemen. It is located near Qubbat al-Mutawakkil Mosque dome in Tahrir Square in the city centre.

Today it houses the National Museum of Yemen.

See also 
 Dar al-Bashair
 Dar al-Hajar
 Dar al-Shukr

Buildings and structures in Sanaa
Palaces in Yemen
Yemeni monarchy